A virge or verge is a type of rod, made of wood.

Etymology
Originally it was one or more branches (the French often use verges, the plural of its equivalent, as the normal word for a rod, the rarer singular verge rather indicates a switch) used as an instrument for corporal punishment, or as a riding crop. It later became a symbol of civil office, used in ceremonies of swearing fealty (from which the legal term tenant by the verge is derived). Further deriving from this use is the sense of a measurement, and so boundary or border, of land, or generally a margin of space.

Modern practice
In modern times it is best known as the ceremonial staff of the Anglican and Episcopal lay church officers known as vergers (or originally virger – the title derives from virge), who originally used it as a 'weapon' to make way for the ecclesiastical procession (compare the Catholic Swiss Guard), and occasionally to chastise unruly choristers.

References

External links
  

Corporal punishments
Christian religious objects